The black guineafowl (Agelastes niger) is a member of the guineafowl bird family. It occurs in humid forests in Central Africa. It is a medium-sized black bird with a bare, pink head and upper neck. Little is known of its behaviour.

Description
The head and upper neck of an adult black guineafowl are unfeathered, revealing the pink skin. A crest of short downy feathers is on the forehead and crown, and the throat and lower neck have a scattering of downy feathers. The body and tail feathers are black with some paler speckled markings on the belly. Males have one to three spurs on their legs, while females either have none or a single short spur. Juveniles are similar, but have buff tips to the feathers on their upper parts, a speckled breast, and white belly. The beak is greenish grey and the legs greyish brown. The call is a monotonous high-pitched "kwee" repeated at the rate of two to three notes per second. The alarm call is an even shriller sound repeated more rapidly.

Behaviour
The black guineafowl has been little studied. It is usually found in pairs or small groups, and is a shy, elusive bird of the forest floor. It occurs in primary and secondary growth woodland, favouring parts with thick undergrowth, but sometimes venturing out onto adjacent cultivated lands. It feeds on invertebrates such as ants, termites, millipedes, and beetles, and also small frogs, seeds, berries, and shoots. The nesting habits of this species are not known, but the eggs are pale reddish-brown, sometimes shaded with yellow or purple. It may breed in the dry season or possibly at any time of year.

Distribution and habitat
The black guineafowl is native to West Central Africa south of the Sahara. Its range includes Nigeria, Cameroon, Equatorial Guinea, Gabon, Angola, the Central African Republic, the Republic of the Congo, and the Democratic Republic of the Congo. The extent of its range is estimated to be . It is found on the forest floor in primary and secondary tropical rainforest, especially with thick undergrowth, and in nearby cultivated croplands.

Research
Black guineafowl are resistant to various diseases that affect poultry, including Ehrlichia ruminantium, which causes heartwater, but the mechanism for this resistance is not currently known to researchers. The black guineafowl's genome includes a toll-like receptor (TLR1) which plays an important role in the bird's immune system. This gene has been studied and includes 2,115 nucleotides, encoding 705 amino acids.  TLR1 is associated with infections caused by bacteria in both humans and mice, and this gene is of interest to researchers because genetic variation in it is associated with increased Gram-positive bacterial infections, organ failure, and death.

Status
The population trend for the black guineafowl seems to be downward, because it is hunted for food, possibly unsustainably, and may suffer from degradation of its habitat. However, it is quite common within its range and the IUCN lists it as being of least concern in its Red List of Threatened Species, as the rate of decline does not seem to justify the bird being placed in a more vulnerable category.

References 

black guineafowl
Birds of Central Africa
Birds described in 1857